Torre Grande Lighthouse is an active lighthouse located atop a coastal tower on the sea front of Marina di Torre Grande, Sardinia on the Sea of Sardinia.

Description
The construction of the massive tower began in 1542 by the Spaniards on order of Charles V and is considered the largest coastal defensive tower in Sardinia. In the 19th century a lantern was placed on the roof of the tower and was built a keeper's house.

The tower is unpainted stone and the lantern is placed inside a room and shown thorough a bay window.
The light is completely automated and managed by the Marina Militare with the identification code number 1394 E.F.; the building is managed by the City of Oristano which transformed it into the Museum of Coastal Towers.

See also
 List of lighthouses in Italy
 Oristano

References

External links
 Servizio Fari Marina Militare

Lighthouses in Italy
Buildings and structures in Sardinia